Altymyrat Myratowiç Annadurdyýew (born April 13, 1993) is a professional Turkmen football player who plays for FC Altyn Asyr. He is also a member of Turkmenistan national football team.

Club career 
He was born in Ashgabat, Turkmenistan, and started his career in futsal team Galkan in Ashgabat. He became the champion of Turkmenistan 2014 and top scorer (10 goals).

In 2015, he moved to the professional football by signing a contract with the FC Ahal. He made his debut for his new club in the framework of the 2015 AFC Cup against FC Dordoi Bishkek, already in the 9 minute, scoring from the free kick. In the first game of the 2015 Ýokary Liga has issued a poker against FC Energetik Türkmebaşy (6:0).

Since 2016 plays for FC Altyn Asyr.

International career 
Annadurdyýew made his senior national team debut on 11 June 2015 against Guam.

International goals
Scores and results list Turkmenistan's goal tally first.

References

External links
 
 

Living people
1993 births
Turkmenistan footballers
Association football forwards
FC Ahal players
FC Altyn Asyr players
Sportspeople from Ashgabat
Turkmenistan international footballers
2019 AFC Asian Cup players